Zhang Xiaoni (born October 29, 1983, in Yantai, Shandong) is a female Chinese basketball player who was part of the teams that won gold medals at the 2002 Asian Games and the 2006 Asian Games. She also competed at the 2008 Summer Olympics in Beijing.

References

External links
 
 

1983 births
Living people
Basketball players at the 2008 Summer Olympics
Olympic basketball players of China
Sportspeople from Yantai
Basketball players from Shandong
Chinese women's basketball players
Asian Games medalists in basketball
Basketball players at the 2002 Asian Games
Basketball players at the 2006 Asian Games
Asian Games gold medalists for China
Medalists at the 2002 Asian Games
Medalists at the 2006 Asian Games
Bayi Kylin players
Jiangsu Phoenix players
Xinjiang Magic Deer players